Diari d'Andorra is a newspaper of the Principality of Andorra. The paper is published in Catalan. It is headquartered in Andorra la Vella and has been published by Premsa Andorrana SA since 1991. Its daily distribution is 19,000 copies with 30,000 in the weekend edition 7dies distributed in homes and businesses.

References

External links
 

1991 establishments in Andorra
Publications established in 1991
Newspapers published in Andorra
Catalan-language newspapers